Umbaúba is a municipality located in the Brazilian state of Sergipe. Its population was 25,550 (2020).

References

Municipalities in Sergipe